The year 1956 in archaeology involved some significant events.

Explorations

Excavations
 Large University of Pennsylvania project at Tikal begins.
 Excavations of the Neolithic settlement at Argissa Magoula in Thessaly by Vladimir Milojčić of the University of Heidelberg begin (continue to 1958).
 Excavations of the Danubian Neolithic settlement at Bylany in Bohemia begin.
 Excavations at Brahmagiri.
 Excavations at Teppe Hasanlu begin (continue to 1974).
 Systematic excavation of Diolkos in Greece by Nikolaos Verdelis begins (continues to 1962).
 Excavations at Longbridge Deverill Cow Down in the United Kingdom under the direction of Sonia Chadwick for the Ministry of Works (continues to 1960).

Publications
 Documents in Mycenaean Greek by Michael Ventris and John Chadwick; documenting decipherment of Linear B writing.

Finds
 Anders Franzén locates the Swedish warship Vasa, sunk on her maiden voyage in 1628, in Stockholm harbor.
 K. M. A. Barnett discovers Lo Ah Tsai Stone Circle on Lamma Island in Hong Kong.

Events
 W. F. Grimes succeeds V. Gordon Childe as director of the University of London Institute of Archaeology.

Births
 March 24 - Alanah Woody, American archaeologist (d. 2007).
 April 30 - Antonio Sagona, Australian archaeologist (d. 2017).
 Yosef Garfinkel, Israeli archaeologist.

Deaths
 June 6 - Hiram Bingham III, American rediscoverer of Machu Picchu (b. 1875).
 September 6 - Michael Ventris, English co-decipherer of Linear B (car accident) (b. 1922).
 September 12 - John Garstang, English archaeologist of the Near East (in Beirut) (b. 1876).
 November 9 - Alan Wace, English archaeologist who worked on Linear B (b. 1879).

References

Archaeology
Archaeology
Archaeology by year